Timofey Timofeyevich Bazhenov (born 25 January 1976, Moscow) is a Russian political figure, former TV host, and deputy of the 8th State Duma convocation.

Starting from 1994, Timofey Bazhenov began to work on the NTV channel, and in 1998 he was officially hired as a reporter. Since then, he has hosted many entertainment TV shows. Bazhenov's political career started in 2015 when he was appointed the head of the press office of Magas city. Since September 2021, he has served as a deputy of the 8th State Duma convocation. He ran with the United Russia.

He is also a founder of the environmental movement that shares his name.

References

1976 births
Living people
Politicians from Moscow
Russian television presenters
United Russia politicians
21st-century Russian politicians
Eighth convocation members of the State Duma (Russian Federation)